Michal Škvarka (born 19 August 1992) is a Slovak professional footballer who plays as a midfielder for Greek Super League club Levadiakos.

Club career

MŠK Žilina
Škvarka made his Corgoň Liga debut for Žilina senior team debut against Nitra on 26 April 2009 at the age of 16.

Loan in MFK Zemplín Michalovce
In July 2011, he joined Slovak club Zemplín Michalovce on a one-year loan from Žilina. Michal made his debut for Michalovce against Ružomberok B on 31 July 2011.

Ferencváros
Škvarka spent a decade in Žilina and became a captain of the club. On 19 June 2019 it was announced that he will join Ferencváros on a three year contract, for a sum of 200 thousand EUR. It was also revealed that Ferencváros had seriously contented for his services even in winter of 2018/19, but the transfer didn't take place due to Škvarka's injury.

On 16 June 2020, he became champion with Ferencváros by beating Budapest Honvéd FC at the Hidegkuti Nándor Stadion on the 30th match day of the 2019–20 Nemzeti Bajnokság I season.

Wisła Kraków
On 6 July 2021, Škvarka's arrival to Polish Wisła Kraków was announced on a two-year deal, with an option for a one-year extension, as a free agent, where he was to be coached by Adrián Guľa - his ex-manager from Žilina.

On 12 July 2022, following Wisła's relegation to I liga, he left the club by mutual consent.

International career
Škvarka was first called up to the senior national team for two unofficial friendly fixtures held in Abu Dhabi, UAE, in January 2017, against Uganda and Sweden. He made his debut against Uganda, being fielded from the start and playing the entire match. Slovakia went on to lose the game 1–3. He also played the first half of the match against Sweden (0–6 loss), when he was replaced by Martin Bukata.

Honours

MŠK Žilina
 Fortuna Liga: 2009–10, 2016–17

Ferencváros
 NB I: 2019–20, 2020–21

Individual
 Fortuna Liga Player of the Year 2016-17

References

External links
 
 MŠK Žilina profile
 Profile at Sports-Info.sk 

1992 births
Living people
Sportspeople from Martin, Slovakia
Association football midfielders
Slovak footballers
Slovak expatriate footballers
Slovakia youth international footballers
Slovakia under-21 international footballers
Slovakia international footballers
MŠK Žilina players
MFK Zemplín Michalovce players
FC ViOn Zlaté Moravce players
Ferencvárosi TC footballers
Wisła Kraków players
Levadiakos F.C. players
Slovak Super Liga players
Nemzeti Bajnokság I players
Ekstraklasa players
Super League Greece players
Expatriate footballers in Hungary
Slovak expatriate sportspeople in Hungary
Expatriate footballers in Poland
Slovak expatriate sportspeople in Poland
Expatriate footballers in Greece
Slovak expatriate sportspeople in Greece